Margarita Louis-Dreyfus (née Bogdanova; born 1 July 1962) is a Russian-born Swiss billionaire businesswoman, chairperson of the Louis-Dreyfus Group.

Early life
Born Margarita Olegovna Bogdanova in Leningrad, she was raised by her grandfather, an electrical engineer, and studied law in Moscow and economics in Leningrad.

Career
When her husband, Robert Louis-Dreyfus, died of leukemia on July 4, 2009, she became heir to the Louis-Dreyfus group and at the same time a majority shareholder of Olympique de Marseille, a football club her husband had owned since 1996. Her  husband had integrated her into the management of the group in 2007, when he learned of the existence of his illness.

On 29 August 2016, Louis-Dreyfus and the Marseille mayor, Jean-Claude Gaudin, stated during a press conference with Frank McCourt that McCourt had agreed in principle to purchase the French Ligue 1 football club, Olympique de Marseille, owned by Louis-Dreyfus. The purchase deal was completed for a reported price tag of 45 million euros on 17 October 2016.

Personal life
In 1988, on a Zurich to London flight, she met Robert Louis-Dreyfus. They married in 1992 and had three sons, including Kyril who is the chairman and majority shareholder of English Championship football club, Sunderland. Margarita, who had been working for a circuit-board equipment seller, became a full-time wife and mother. She took over as chairman of the Louis Dreyfus Group in 2009, following her husband's death from leukemia.

In 2016, she had a net worth of $9.5 billion. She is a Swiss citizen living in Zurich with her three sons (Éric born in 1992, and twins, Maurice and Kyril, born in 1997), according to Forbes. Her partner is Philipp Hildebrand, the former head of the Swiss central bank. She gave birth to twin girls on 21 March 2016.

Margarita is the second cousin once removed (by marriage) of American actress Julia Louis-Dreyfus.

References

Living people
Swiss billionaires
Female billionaires
Margarita
Moscow State University alumni
Russian emigrants to France
Businesspeople from Saint Petersburg
Swiss chairpersons of corporations
Women corporate directors
1962 births
Olympique de Marseille
Russian corporate directors
21st-century Swiss businesswomen
21st-century Swiss businesspeople